Stellifer is a genus of fish in the family Sciaenidae, the drums and croakers. It is found in New World waters. Many species are known commonly as stardrums.

In the Americas, this is one of the most diverse genera among the sciaenids. Its members can be found in the tropics and subtropics and in shallow and deeper waters. Some are semianadromous, spawning in the ocean near estuaries so the eggs and young will be taken into lower-salinity environments on the tides.

The genus belongs to the subfamily Stelliferinae, whose members have double-chambered swim bladders (the smaller front chamber is "yoke-shaped" and the main chamber is "carrot-shaped") and two pairs of large otoliths.

These fish are very common in their range, and there are usually at least two species occurring together. Stellifer rastrifer is one of the most abundant sciaenids in the seas along the coast of Brazil.

These fish are carnivorous, with diet assessments of a few different species finding mysids such as Mysidopsis coelhoi, copepods such as Acartia lilljeborgii and Pseudodiaptomus acutus, sergestoid prawns such as Peisos petrunkevitchi, amphipods, chaetognaths, isopods, cumaceans, ostracods, ascidian tunicates, nematodes, polychaetes, fish, and bivalves, or at least their siphons. S. rastrifer is known to cannibalize juveniles of its own species.

Several species are common bycatch in the seabob shrimp industry.

Species include:
Stellifer brasiliensis
Stellifer chaoi
Stellifer chrysoleuca - shortnose stardrum, corvinilla chata
Stellifer colonensis
Stellifer ephelis
Stellifer ericymba - hollow stardrum, corvinilla hueca
Stellifer fuerthii - white stardrum
Stellifer griseus - gray stardrum
Stellifer illecebrosus - silver stardrum, mojararilla, corvinilla plateada 
Stellifer lanceolatus - American stardrum, corvinilla lanza
Stellifer magoi
Stellifer mancorensis - smooth stardrum
Stellifer melanocheir - black stardrum
Stellifer microps - smalleye stardrum
Stellifer minor - minor stardrum
Stellifer naso - burrito
Stellifer oscitans - yawning stardrum
Stellifer pizarroensis - Pizarro stardrum
Stellifer rastrifer - rake stardrum
Stellifer stellifer - little croaker
Stellifer venezuelae
Stellifer walkeri - professor stardrum, corvinilla del profesor
Stellifer wintersteenorum - amigo stardrum, corvinilla amigable
Stellifer zestocarus - softhead stardrum

References

Sciaenidae